Amarain  (Arabic : قمرين ) (literally "Two Moons" in Arabic) also often  Amarein is a 1999 album by Amr Diab that contains his international hit "Amarain" of the same name.

The album also contains two international cooperations of Diab, one with The Legendary King of Rai Khaled in "Albey" (in Arabic قلبي) and the second with Angela Dimitriou in the bilingual Arabic/Greek "Bahibak Aktar" (in Arabic بحبك أكتر)

Track list
(Arabic language song titles in brackets)
Amarain (Two moons) (قمرين)			
Ana (me) (أنا) 			
Albey (My heart) (with Khaled) (قلبي)			
Bahibak Aktar (Love you more)  (with Angela Dimitriou) (بحبك أكتر)			
Betuhashney (miss you) (بتوحشني)		
Wi lsa Bethibahw	(You still love him) (ولسه بتحبوا)		
Khalik Fakirney (remember me) (خليك فاكرني)			
Hikayatey (my stories) (حكاياتي)

1999 albums
Amr Diab albums